A by-election for the seat of Newcastle in the New South Wales Legislative Assembly was held on 25 October 2014. The by-election was triggered by the resignation of Liberal-turned-independent MP Tim Owen, who won the seat at the 2011 election with a 36.7 percent primary and 52.6 percent two-party-preferred vote.

The previous New South Wales by-election had seen a 26-point two-party-preferred swing to Labor.

Background
Newcastle, located in the traditional Labor heartland of the Hunter Region, was won for the Liberals by Owen at the 2011 election on a swing of 26.9 points.  Owen was the first Liberal to win the seat since its re-creation in 1927.  Before Owen's win, Newcastle had only been out of Labor hands twice in its current incarnation; independent George Keegan held it from 1988 to 1991, and Bryce Gaudry sat as an independent for part of 2007 after losing Labor preselection.

In May 2014, after admitting that he had probably received illegal donations in the 2011 campaign, Owen announced he would not re-nominate for Newcastle in the next state election.  On 6 August 2014, the New South Wales Independent Commission Against Corruption heard evidence that illegal donations from Newcastle-area developers had funded Owen's campaign, prompting the commission's counsel to question the validity of Owen's victory.  Following this disclosure, Owen resigned from the Liberal Party to sit as an independent pending the results of the inquiry.  A week later, on 12 August, Owen admitted he had lied to the ICAC about returning one of the illicit donations.  He resigned from parliament hours later under pressure.

Dates

Candidates
The eight candidates in ballot paper order are as follows:

The Liberals declined to contest the by-election, and also declined to field a candidate in the by-election in Charlestown held on the same day.  NSW Liberal director Tony Nutt stated that the Liberals would not contest either by-election "as an explicit act of atonement" for the revelations, and Premier Mike Baird said that the Liberals didn't deserve to contest the seats while they were "getting (their) house in order." According to ABC election analyst Antony Green, it was the first known occasion of a sitting government in NSW opting not to contest by-elections in seats that it previously held.

Results

Tim Owen ( / ) resigned.

See also
2014 Charlestown state by-election
List of New South Wales state by-elections

References

External links
2014 Newcastle state by-election: Antony Green ABC
2014 Newcastle state by-election: NSW electoral commission

2014 elections in Australia
New South Wales state by-elections
2010s in New South Wales